Mission Zero is an American indie pop band based in New Haven, CT. Started in 2010 by siblings David Keith and singer/multi-instrumentalist Chenot (born Megan Keith), the duo has released three albums. In May 2015 they headlined at the Whisky a Go Go in Los Angeles, CA.

Discography 

 People in Glass Yachts (2015)
 Sky Candy (2013)
 Bruises on the Map (2011)

References 

 Cihak, Izzy. "Mission Zero: My Favorite Lounge Act" Philthy Mag, July 15, 2014
 Yung, Ben. "Mission Zero: People In Glass Yachts EP" The Revue, May 11, 2015
 Dauphinais, Jennifer. "Mission Zero: People In Glass Yachts" Local Band Review, April 22, 2015
 Mims, Dan. "Making Tracks" Daily Nutmeg, July 9, 2014
 O'Connell, Joshua. "Required Listening" 2015

Indie pop groups from Connecticut
American pop music duos
Male–female musical duos